The 2019 Maharashtra Legislative Assembly election was held on 21 October 2019 to elect all 288 members of the state's Legislative Assembly. After a 61.4% turnout in the election, the ruling National Democratic Alliance (NDA) of the Bharatiya Janata Party (BJP) and Shiv Sena (SHS) won a majority. Following differences over the government formation, the alliance was dissolved, precipitating a political crisis. Since a council of ministers had not been formed after no party could manage to form the government, President's rule was imposed in the state.
On 23 November 2019, Devendra Fadnavis was sworn in as the Chief Minister and Ajit Pawar was sworn in as Deputy Chief Minister. However both of them resigned on 26 November 2019 before the floor test and on 28 November 2019, Shiv Sena, NCP, and Congress formed the government under a new alliance Maha Vikas Aghadi (MVA), with Uddhav Thackeray as the Chief Minister. Subsequently, Uddhav Thackeray had to resign due to the Shiv Sena being split which was led by Eknath Shinde. Eknath Shinde is currently the Chief Minister with a BJP-Shiv Sena alliance with BJP's Devendra Fadnavis as the deputy Chief Minister.

Background 
The results were out on 21 October 2019 with the Sena-BJP Alliance getting majority, enough to form the government. However, Shiv Sena and BJP had a fall out which compelled Shiv Sena to form an alliance with the opposition, ending their alliance. The new alliance, named Maha Vikas Aghadi, consists of Congress, Shiv Sena and NCP forming the Government

Election schedule 

The Election Commission announced the election dates for the Assembly elections in Maharashtra.

Political parties and campaign 
National Democratic Alliance
Pre-election alliance of National Democratic Alliance (NDA) was formed between Bharatiya Janata Party (BJP) and Shiv Sena (SHS). Later, however, SHS left NDA and formed Three-Party Alliance Government Maha Vikas Aghadi seeing inability to share power with each other.

United Progressive Alliance
Pre-election alliance of United Progressive Alliance (UPA) was formed with Indian National Congress (INC) and Nationalist Congress Party (NCP). INC filled nominations on 145 seats and NCP on 123. Other parties that supported the UPA alliance were Raju Shetti-led Swabhimani Shetkari Saghtana (4 seats), the Peasants and Workers Party (6 seats), Samajwadi Party (3 seats), Bahujan Vikas Aghadi (3 seats) and Ravi Rana-led Swabhiman Sanghatana (1 seat). The opposition finalised common nominee of 2 seats of Mankhatao and Kothrud constituency. Peoples Republican Party (3 seats) and Bahujan Republican Socialist Party (2 seats) will be fielding their candidates on the symbols of INC and NCP. The Samajwadi Party later rescinded its support for the alliance, to contest for 7 seats separately instead. Shiv Sena later joined UPA after leaving NDA.

Others
Various prominent parties in the Maharashtra's political scenario did not join hands with either of the two alliances. This includes Vanchit Bahujan Aghadi that will be contesting all 288 seats. All India Majlis-e-Ittehadul Muslimeen will be contesting from 44 seats, mostly from Muslim predominant constituencies. Maharashtra Navnirman Sena will be contesting from 103 seats.

A total of 5543 nominations were received by Election Commission throughout the state of which about 3239 candidatures were left after others were rejected or had their nominations withdrawn. The Chiplun constituency has the least candidates (3 candidates), whereas Nanded South constituency had the maximum candidates (38 candidates).

Maha Yuti Campaign 
On 30 September 2019, The Bharatiya Janata Party and the Shiv Sena announced that they have finalised their Seat sharing agreements with each other and agreed to fight under the banner of Maha Yuti Alliance. Few days before, Union Home Minister Amit Shah had visited Matoshree (Uddhav Thackeray's Home) and met Uddhav Thackeray for the same.

The parties however were clashing on the subject of 50-50 CM sharing formula.

The campaign was led by Maharashtra CM Devendra Fadnavisand then Shiv Sena Chief Uddhav Thackeray

Shiv Sena

Jan- Aashirwad Yatra 
In order to expand the party's image and to improve its vote share within the state as well as in the Alliance, the Shiv Sena started Jan Aashirwad Yatra headed by party's youth icon and Yuva Sena Chief Aaditya Thackeray. Under this, Aditya Thackeray with his party cadres travelled city-to-city, village-to-village convincing people to vote in favour of his party and the Alliance.

Aditya Samwad 
On par with the Jan Aashirwad Yatra, Aaditya Thackeray interacted with youth community across the state under the Aditya Samwad, there he addressed questions related common problems faced by today's generation and provided solutions for them. Aditya Samwad was promoted and supported by Indian Political Strategist Prashant Kishor and his company I-PAC.

Bharatiya Janata Party

Maha- Janadesh Yatra 
The BJP launched the Maha- Janadesh Yatra headed by then incumbent CM and BJP Leader Devendra Fadnavis, State President Chandrakant Patil and Union Minister Rajnath Singh. Under the Yatra, the BJP hoped to approach more constituencies and voters.

Maha Aaghadi Campaign 
On 16 September 2019, the Indian National Congress and the Nationalist Congress Party sealed their deal for seat sharing arrangements for the elections, both the parties contested on 125 Seats and kept 38 seats for Independents/Smaller Parties, This comes after the INC-NCP lost many heavyweight leaders joining BJP-Sena.

Both the parties were unclear about the CM Candidate from the Alliance.

Nationalist Congress Party

Shiv Swarajya Yatra 
The NCP flagged off the Shiv Swarajya Yatra from Shivneri, headed by Chief Sharad Pawar, Ajit Pawar and State President Jayant Patil, the Party hoped that it would reach maximum people that would help them to raise strong Anti-Incumbency. The campaign by the Nationalist Congress Party was seen as a try-hard campaign against the mighty Sena-BJP Alliance, which proved correct making the BJP-Sena losing vast constituencies against the Congress-NCP.

The NCP also managed to revive the itself by successfully gaining their stronghold Western Maharashtra back from the Sena-BJP Alliance, the lone-NCP was seen as the main and unexpected competitor against the Sena-BJP.

The Sena-BJP though managed to form the government for the second term, but lost core-ministers and constituencies to the NCP.

Indian National Congress

Pol Khol Yatra 
The INC flagged off the Pol Khol Yatra headed by senior state party leaders like Ashok Chavan, State President Balasaheb Thorat and Madhya Pradesh CM Kamal Nath.

The Pol Khol Yatra was intended to expose the ruling Maha Yuti Government's failures and claims. The Yatra only little but helped the party in securing fate in Maharashtra.

Surveys and polls 
Subsequent to the election, pre-polling and exit polling in all cases but one (India Today-Axis exit poll), was seen to have significantly over-estimated the vote share and seat projections to the ruling right-wing NDA coalition.

Vote share

Seat projections

Results

Region-wise break up

City-wise results

Division-wise Results

District-wise results

Results by constituency

Aftermath

After declaration of election result on 24 October 2019, Shiv Sena declined to support BJP for the government formation demanding rotational Chief Ministers of both parties for 2.5 years each, which was promised by BJP during elections and withdrew from Maha-Yuti Alliance. As no political party was able to prove the majority in the assembly, the President's rule was imposed in the state following recommendation by the Governor on 12 November 2019.

Ultimately, the combination of largest legislative party BJP and a faction of the NCP agreed to form a grand coalition with Devendra Fadnavis returning as Chief Minister. Ajit Pawar of NCP was sworn in as Deputy Chief Minister. But the NCP national leadership had rebuffed this move and announced that it will not support BJP. On Tue, 26 Nov, Devendra Fadnavis resigned at a press conference in Mumbai.

On Thursday, 28 November Shiv Sena chief Uddhav Thackarey was sworn in as chief minister.

Bibliography

See also 

 2019 elections in India
 2019 Indian general election in Maharashtra
 2019 Haryana Legislative Assembly election
 Uddhav Thackeray ministry
 2022 Maharashtra political crisis

References 

2019
2019
Maharashtra
2019 in Maharashtra